Sir Richard Arman Gregory, 1st Baronet FRS, FRAS (29 January 1864 – 15 September 1952) was a British astronomer and promoter of science. Some of his work was published as by Richard A. or R. A. Gregory.

Richard Arman Gregory was born in Bristol on 29 January 1864. His father was John Gregory, 'the poet cobbler'.

Gregory was professor of astronomy at Queen's College, London, and wrote textbooks on astronomy, chemistry, hygiene, physics and other scientific subjects. He was also a member of the Council of British Association for the advancement of science and Chairman of the Committee on Science Teaching in Secondary Schools. He was knighted in 1919, for "remarkable public work in organising the British
Scientific Products Exhibition". He subsequently served as editor of Nature between 1919 and 1939, and was credited with helping to establish Nature in the international scientific community. In 1924, he served as president of the Geographical Association. His obituary by the Royal Society stated: "Gregory was always very interested in the international contacts of science, and in the columns of Nature he always gave generous space to accounts of the activities of the International Scientific Unions." He was created a Baronet, of Bristol in the County of Gloucester, on 30 January 1931. In 1933 he was elected a Fellow of the Royal Society.

Gregory married Dorothy Mary Page (Dusky) on 27 Jan 1931. He died in September 1952, aged 88, when the baronetcy became extinct. Gregory was elected by the old students of the Royal College of Science to be president of the Royal College of Science Association of Imperial College London, and served from 1919 until 1922.

Arms

References

External links 
 
  

1864 births
1952 deaths
Baronets in the Baronetage of the United Kingdom
Fellows of the Royal Society (Statute 12)
Fellows of the Royal Astronomical Society
Nature (journal) editors
Place of birth missing